Marciana (also Marciana of Toledo) (died 9 January 304 in Caesarea, Mauretania Caesariensis) is venerated as a martyr and saint. The Latin account of her martyrdom was written possibly in the 5th century.   

Marciana's martydom occurred during the Great Persecution. Historian Brent D. Shaw states that she led an "aggressive anti-idolatry campaign". Shaw states that her legend emphasized her virginity and commitment to ascetism, and contained "a new kind of hostility that was added to the old story of Christian-pagan hatreds". According to her story, Marciana was a devout young Christian woman "so filled with zeal for her new faith" that she left her family home to reside in Caesarea, approximately 80 miles east of their home and "immediately displayed an aggressive hostility to traditional forms of civic religion". She violently attacked a statue of the goddess Diana in the city, tearing the head off the statue and smashing its body to pieces. The local citizens had her arrested and brought her before the governor's tribunal for punishment. She was imprisoned in the local gladiatorial school, which Shaw states was "a brutal test" of her sexual purity. 

According to the narrative, the head of the local synagogue and his family insisted that Marciana be punished more harshly, by placing her in the local arena, where she impressed the locals with her nobility and heroism. They were ready to plead for her with the governor, but the Jews insisted that a bull attack her in the arena, which killed her. After her death, a leopard was sent in and it snapped her neck. The story goes on to say that a fire broke out in the synagogue, but repairs were never able to be accomplished. Shaw states that Marciana's story demonstrates the conflict between the Christian and Jewish communities in Caesarea during the period and was part of the "long and well-developed” anti-Jewish literature of the time". Shaw cautions, however, that narratives like this, that directly include Jews in the persecution of Christians in Africa during the 4th and 5th centuries, were "exceedingly rare".

Veneration
The Mozarabic office has a special hymn in her honor.

References

Works cited 

 Shaw, Brent D. (2011). Sacred Violence: African Christians and Sectarian Hatred in the Age of Augustine. Cambridge, Massachusetts: Cambridge University Press. ISBN 9780521127257. 

303 deaths
4th-century Roman women
4th-century Christian martyrs
Deaths due to bull attacks
Deaths due to leopard attacks
Executed ancient Roman women
Female criminals
Late Ancient Christian female saints
People executed by the Roman Empire
Saints from Mauretania Caesariensis
Year of birth unknown
4th-century deaths